Samoa observed daylight saving time in 2010–21. During DST, the observed time changes were from UTC+13:00 to UTC+14:00. Due to the 2009 Samoa tsunami, the planned introduction in 2009 was not carried out. At the time of its introduction on September 26, Samoa was in UTC-11:00 as its primary time zone and switched to UTC-10:00 under DST. On December 29, 2011, Samoa switched from UTC-10:00 to UTC+14:00, skipping the 30th and changing from  -10/-11 to +14/+13. In 2021 Samoa scrapped daylight saving time.

References

See also

Time in Samoa
Samoa